Andrew Small  (born 6 January 1993) is a British Paralympic athlete who competes in sprint and middle-distance events in the T33 classification.

Personal history
Small was born in England in 1993. Small had nerve damage which affects him both neurologically and physically. He lives in Nantwich, Cheshire. He attended Pilgrim's Way Primary in Canterbury, Brine Leas School and subsequently South Cheshire College.

Athletics career
Small was inspired to take up athletics after watching the 2012 Summer Paralympics in London. From 2013 he began competing at national meets mainly competing in 100 and 200 metres sprints. The following year he competed at his first overseas IPC Grand Prix, in Nottwil in Switzerland. In 2016 he took part in the European Championships at Grosseto, entering the 100 metres (T33). Despite finishing third behind Great Britain teammates Toby Gold and Dan Bramall, he was not awarded a bronze due to a lack of other competitors.

In July 2016 Small was announced as a member of the Great Britain team to compete at the Rio Paralympics. He took part in the 100 metres (T33) sprint, finishing third in a personal best time of 17.96 seconds.

Small was appointed Member of the Order of the British Empire (MBE) in the 2022 New Year Honours for services to athletics.

References

External links
 
 
 
 

1993 births
Living people
English male wheelchair racers
British male sprinters
Paralympic athletes of Great Britain
Paralympic gold medalists for Great Britain
Paralympic bronze medalists for Great Britain
Paralympic medalists in athletics (track and field)
Athletes (track and field) at the 2016 Summer Paralympics
Athletes (track and field) at the 2020 Summer Paralympics
Medalists at the 2016 Summer Paralympics
Medalists at the 2020 Summer Paralympics
Sportspeople from Stockport
Members of the Order of the British Empire